Silvia Solymosyová (born 10 June 2003) is a Slovak artistic swimmer. In 2022, the Solymosy siblings won an historic, first-time medal for Slovakia in artistic swimming event at a LEN European Aquatics Championships, winning the bronze medal in the mixed duet free routine at the 2022 European Aquatics Championships.

Background
Solymosyová was born 10 June 2003 in Bratislava. She has two younger brothers Jozef  and Ivan. She gained popularity for her TikTok videos of her underwater dancing and walking. Solymosyová appeared in the documentary "Silvia Solymosyová: The art of walking under water | Her Game" by Olympic Channel.

Career
At the 2018 FINA World Junior Artistic Swimming Championships in Budapest, Hungary, Solymosyová placed 12th in the Women Team Free Combination. At the 2019 FINA World Championships in Gwangju, Korea, Solymosyova acted as a reserve for the Free Combination.
 
At the 2021 European Championships held in Budapest, Hungary, Solymosyová placed fourth twice (mixed duets).

At the 2022 World Aquatics Championships again in Budapest, Hungary, Solymosyová placed ninth in the free mixed duet  and tenth in the technical mixed duet.
In the mixed duet free routine at the 2022 European Aquatics Championships, she won the bronze medal with her partner Jozef Solymosy with a score of 77.0333 points.  She also won a bronze medal in the mixed duet technical routine with a score of 75.5914 points.

International championships

Awards
 2020 SWAMMY AWARDS VIRAL VIDEO OF THE YEAR

See also
Slovakia at the 2022 World Aquatics Championships

References

External links
 Silvia Solymosyová at FINA
 Silvia Solymosyová at Instagram
 Silvia Solymosyová at TikTok

2003 births
Living people
Slovak synchronized swimmers
Artistic swimmers at the 2019 World Aquatics Championships
Artistic swimmers at the 2022 World Aquatics Championships
European Aquatics Championships medalists in synchronised swimming
Sportspeople from Bratislava